Kamil Čontofalský (born 3 June 1978) is a Slovak professional football coach and a former goalkeeper. He is the goalkeeping coach with Slavoj Vyšehrad.

Career

Club
Čontofalský spent four seasons with Bohemians 1905 in the Czech Gambrinus liga and seven seasons with Zenit Saint Petersburg in the Russian Premier League. With Zenit he won 6 titles, including Russian Premier League 2007, 2007–08 UEFA Cup and 2008 UEFA Super Cup.

Čontofalský was released by Tampa Bay on 5 November 2015.

Career statistics

Club

International

Statistics accurate as of match played 17 November 2007

Career honours
Zenit St. Petersburg
UEFA Cup (1): 2007/08
UEFA Super Cup (1): 2008
Russian Premier League
Winner (1): 2007
Runner-up (1): 2003
3rd place (1): 2009
Russian Cup (1): 2009/10
Russian Super Cup (1): 2008
Russian Premier League Cup (1): 2003
Fort Lauderdale Strikers
North American Soccer League
Runner-up (1): 2014

References

External links
 Profile at iDNES.cz 
 Profile at the official FC Zenit St. Petersburg website 
 

1978 births
Living people
Sportspeople from Košice
Slovak footballers
Slovak expatriate footballers
Association football goalkeepers
Bohemians 1905 players
FC VSS Košice players
SK Slavia Prague players
FC Zenit Saint Petersburg players
UEFA Cup winning players
AEL Limassol players
Slovakia international footballers
Slovakia under-21 international footballers
Footballers at the 2000 Summer Olympics
Olympic footballers of Slovakia
AS Trenčín players
Slovak Super Liga players
Russian Premier League players
Czech First League players
Cypriot First Division players
Expatriate footballers in the Czech Republic
Slovak expatriate sportspeople in the Czech Republic
Expatriate footballers in Russia
Slovak expatriate sportspeople in Russia
Expatriate footballers in Cyprus
Slovak expatriate sportspeople in Cyprus
Expatriate footballers in Greece
Slovak expatriate sportspeople in Greece
Fort Lauderdale Strikers players
North American Soccer League players
Tampa Bay Rowdies players
Expatriate soccer players in the United States
Slovak expatriate sportspeople in the United States